Bishindeegiin Urantungalag (24 February 1977 in Khentii Province) is a Mongolian archer. She competed at the 2012 Summer Olympics in the women's individual event, but eliminated in the round of 16 by Lee Sung-Jin. She competed in the individual recurve event and the team recurve event at the 2015 World Archery Championships in Copenhagen, Denmark.

References

External links
 

Living people
1977 births
Mongolian female archers
Archers at the 2012 Summer Olympics
Olympic archers of Mongolia
Archers at the 1998 Asian Games
Archers at the 2006 Asian Games
Archers at the 2010 Asian Games
Archers at the 2014 Asian Games
Archers at the 2018 Asian Games
Asian Games competitors for Mongolia
Archers at the 2020 Summer Olympics
People from Khentii Province
20th-century Mongolian women
21st-century Mongolian women